Klaus-Peter Hanisch (29 January 1952 – 30 August 2009) was a professional German footballer.

In the 1970s, Hanisch made a total of 19 Bundesliga appearances for Hertha BSC and Tennis Borussia Berlin. His playing career was cut short as he was forced to retire aged 28 due to injury. Hanisch died in 2009 of a heart attack.

References

External links 
 

1952 births
2009 deaths
Footballers from Berlin
German footballers
Association football defenders
Bundesliga players
2. Bundesliga players
Hertha Zehlendorf players
Hertha BSC players
Tennis Borussia Berlin players